DXDC (621 AM) RMN Davao is a radio station owned and operated by the Radio Mindanao Network. The station's studio is located at the 2/F San Vicente Bldg., Iñigo St. cor. Bonifacio St., Davao City, and its transmitter is located at Gatdula Heights, Madapo Hills, Davao City.

References

Radio stations established in 1961
Radio stations in Davao City
News and talk radio stations in the Philippines